Petrellfjellet is a prominent, mainly ice-free mountain between Slokstallen Mountain and Mount Grytoyr in the Muhlig-Hofmann Mountains, Queen Maud Land. Mapped by Norwegian cartographers from surveys and air photos by the Norwegian Antarctic Expedition (1956–60) and named Petrellfjellet (the petrel mountain).

Mountains of Queen Maud Land
Princess Martha Coast